Tesco Value is a music band created in Denmark in 2000, playing alternative music. The band was founded by Czesław Mozil. In 2002 the band was playing on Roskilde Festival.

Members 
 Czesław Mozil (Denmark/Poland) - vocals
 Magdalena Entell (Sweden) - contrabass
 Linda Edsjo (Sweden) - percussion
 Daniel Heløy Davidsen (Denmark/Norway) - guitar
 Martin Bennebo (Denmark)  - accordion

Discography 
 Tesco Value (2002; 2008, re-edited twice, POL: gold disc)
 Violin Girl (single)
 Songs For The Gatekeeper (2005)
 Official Bootleg (2005)
 Piosenka Dla Pajączka (single)
 Tesco Value (2 CDs; re-edition as Czesław Śpiewa/Tesco Value) (2008)
 Songs For The Gatekeeper (re-edition as Czesław Śpiewa/Tesco Value) (23 March 2009)

References

External links 
 Czesław Mozil on myspace.com

Danish alternative rock groups